Edward Grimes  (c. 1811 – 2 June 1859) was a pastoralist, Auditor-General of Victoria (Australia) and a member of the Victorian Legislative Council.

In 1844 Grimes was appointed a magistrate for the Port Phillip District; in 1851 he was clerk of the Victorian Executive Council.
 
On 8 December 1853, Grimes was appointed Auditor-General and a member of the original (unicameral) Victorian Legislative Council. Hugh Childers succeeded Grimes as Auditor-General by November 1855.

Grimes died in London, England, on 2 June 1859.

References

1811 births
1859 deaths
Members of the Victorian Legislative Council
19th-century Australian politicians